Federal Highway 184 (Carretera Federal 184) is a Federal Highway of Mexico. The highway travels from Felipe Carrillo Puerto, Quintana Roo in the southeast to Muna, Yucatán in the northwest.

References

184